DEBKAfile is an Israeli military intelligence website based in Jerusalem, providing commentary and analyses on terrorism, intelligence, national security, military and international relations, with a particular focus on the Middle East. It is available in both English and Hebrew. The word "debka" refers to the Arab folk dance dabke.

History 
The site started in the summer of 2000, and is operated from the Jerusalem home of journalists Giora Shamis and Diane Shalem. It has been awarded Forbes' Best of the Web award. Forbes identifies the archives as the best part of the website, but warns that "most of the information is attributed to unidentified sources."

The website was suspended in October 2014, following its own report of the illness of its chief editor. The website resumed coverage in December 2014.

Another apparent pause in publication occurred after an August 24, 2022 article was posted and articles didn’t continue to resume regularly until December 2022.

Criticism 
Wired.com's Noah Shachtman wrote in 2001 that the site "clearly reports with a point of view; the site is unabashedly in the hawkish camp of Israeli politics". Yediot Achronot investigative reporter Ronen Bergman states that the site relies on information from sources with an agenda, such as neo-conservative elements of the US Republican Party, "whose worldview is that the situation is bad and is only going to get worse," and that Israeli intelligence officials do not consider even 10 percent of the site's content to be reliable.

The site's operators, in contrast, state that 80 percent of what Debka reports turns out to be true, and point to its year 2000 prediction that al-Qaeda would again strike the World Trade Center, and that it had warned well before the 2006 war in Lebanon that Hezbollah had amassed 12,000 Katyusha rockets pointed at northern Israel.

References

External links 
 
 
 

Internet properties established in 2000
2000 establishments in Israel
Intelligence websites
Israeli news websites
Mass media in Jerusalem